Evgeni Kisurin (alternate spelling: Evgeny) (born January 28, 1969) is a Russian former professional basketball player, and coach. At a height of 2.07 m tall, he played at the power forward and center positions.

College career
Kisurin played college basketball at VCU.

Professional playing career

Clubs
Kisurin spent an important part of his career playing for CSKA Moscow. He helped his team reach the EuroLeague Final Four in 1996.

Russian national team
Kisurin was a regular member of the senior Russian national basketball team. With Russia, he won silver medals at the 1994 FIBA World Championship, and 1998 FIBA World Championship. He also won a bronze medal at the 1997 EuroBasket.

He also played at the 1999 EuroBasket, and at the 2000 Summer Olympic Games.

Coaching career
On April 8, 2013, he was appointed the acting head coach of the Russian club Spartak Saint-Petersburg.

References

External links 
FIBA Profile
FIBA Europe Profile
Sports-Reference.com Profile
Italian League Profile 

1969 births
Living people
BC Spartak Saint Petersburg players
Centers (basketball)
KK Cibona players
KK Włocławek players
Pallacanestro Varese players
PBC CSKA Moscow players
Power forwards (basketball)
Russian men's basketball players
Russian expatriate basketball people in the United States
Soviet men's basketball players
VCU Rams men's basketball players
Olympique Antibes basketball players
Olympic basketball players of Russia
Basketball players at the 2000 Summer Olympics
1998 FIBA World Championship players
1994 FIBA World Championship players
Sportspeople from Novosibirsk